The 2020–21 Alabama State Hornets basketball team represented Alabama State University in the 2020–21 NCAA Division I men's basketball season. The Hornets, led by first-year head coach Mo Williams, played their home games at the Dunn–Oliver Acadome in Montgomery, Alabama as members of the Southwestern Athletic Conference.

Previous season
The Hornets finished the 2019–20 season 8–24, 7–11 in SWAC play to finish in seventh place. They lost in the first round of the SWAC tournament to Southern.

On March 27, head coach Lewis Jackson announced his resignation, ending his 15-year tenure with the Hornets. On May 12, it was announced that former NBA player Mo Williams would be named the school's next head coach.

Roster

Schedule and results 

|-
!colspan=12 style=| SWAC regular season

|-

Sources

References

Alabama State Hornets basketball seasons
Alabama State Hornets
Alabama State Hornets basketball
Alabama State Hornets basketball